Nevada National Forest was established by the U.S. Forest Service in Nevada on February 10, 1909 with . On July 1, 1932 the entire Toiyabe National Forest was added. On October 1, 1957 the forest was divided between Humboldt National Forest and the reinstated Toiyabe National Forest, and the name was discontinued.  The Spring Mountains in Clark County of southern Nevada were in the former Nevada National Forest.

References

External links
Forest History Society
Forest History Society:Listing of the National Forests of the United States Text from Davis, Richard C., ed. Encyclopedia of American Forest and Conservation History. New York: Macmillan Publishing Company for the Forest History Society, 1983. Vol. II, pp. 743-788.

Former National Forests of Nevada
Spring Mountains